Samuel Stocking House is a historic home located at Morristown in St. Lawrence County, New York.  It is a limestone -story rectangular structure with a -story wing.  It features a hipped roof with balustraded deck.  It was built about 1821 and possesses a combination of Federal and Greek Revival styles.

It was listed on the National Register of Historic Places in 1982.

References

Houses on the National Register of Historic Places in New York (state)
Federal architecture in New York (state)
Greek Revival houses in New York (state)
Houses completed in 1821
Houses in St. Lawrence County, New York
National Register of Historic Places in St. Lawrence County, New York